The GBU-37 (Guided Bomb Unit-37) Global Positioning System Aided Munition (GAM) was developed for use with the B-2 Bomber. The bomb can penetrate hardened targets or targets buried deep underground. The first all-weather precision-guided bunker buster, it became operational in 1997. It has been replaced on the B-2 by the 5,000-pound GPS-aided/INS-guided GBU-28.

References

External links
 Northrop Grumman GAM (GPS-Aided Munition) - Designation Systems

Anti-fortification weapons
Guided bombs of the United States
Military equipment introduced in the 1990s